Leonela Paola Yúdica Andino (born 18 September 1988) is an Argentine professional boxer who has held the IBF female flyweight title since 2014. As of September 2020, she is ranked as the world's third best active female flyweight by BoxRec and fifth by The Ring.

Early life
Yúdica was born in Santa Lucía, San Juan, Argentina, on 18 September 1988. She made her boxing debut on 21 April 2012, beating Soledad del Valle Frias by unanimous decision.

Professional career
She won the Argentina flyweight title in her first ten-round bout in October 2014. In her following fight, two months later, she captured the IBF female flyweight title against Gabriela Bouvier on a split decision, the judges' scores being 97–93, 97–93 and 94–96.

Yúdica retained the world title in March 2015 when she drew with Vanesa Lorena Taborda in a fight where both fighters lost a point for fouling. She retained the title in seven subsequent matches, all of which were held at Estadio Aldo Cantoni, in San Juan. Her four title defences after the Taborda fight were all won by unanimous decision; against Tyrieshia Douglas in July 2015; Soledad del Valle Frias in April 2016; Carolina Álvarez in March 2017; and Yunoka Furugawa on 13 October 2017. In August 2018 she beat Yairineth Altuve by majority decision. A rematch against Altuve in December 2018 saw Yúdica win by unanimous decision.

In a fight against challenger Isabel Millan in August 2019, a clash of heads between the boxers in the fourth round caused Yúdica to suffer from significant bleeding. The fight was declared a no contest due to this, and Yúdica retained the title.

In December 2018, she won a house in an Instituto Provincial de la Vivienda (Provincial Housing Institute) raffle.

Professional boxing record

References

External links
 

1988 births
Living people
Argentine women boxers
Flyweight boxers
International Boxing Federation champions
Sportspeople from San Juan Province, Argentina